Anonychomyrma scrutator is a species of ant in the genus Anonychomyrma. Described by Smith in 1859, the species is endemic to Asia.

References

Anonychomyrma
Hymenoptera of Asia
Insects described in 1859